N.I. David Memorial Trophy is an annual inter-club football tournament held at Thrissur Municipal Corporation Stadium, Thrissur. The football championship was started in 1996 by the then Superintendent of Police in memory of N. I. David IPS who died whilst in office as the Commandant, KAP 1st  Battalion, Thrissur. The tournament is run by a society with the Superintendent of Police as President. Thrissur District Police and Thrissur Municipal Corporation jointly hold this tournament.

References

Football in Thrissur
Football cup competitions in India